Eddie Stanky Field is a baseball park in Mobile, Alabama.  During the 1990s, it was the home of the Mobile BaySharks.  It is currently home to the South Alabama Jaguars baseball team and was home to the 2007 Sun Belt Conference baseball tournament.  The ballpark has a capacity of 4,500 people.

In 2013, the Jaguars ranked 41st among Division I baseball programs in attendance, averaging 1,537 per home game.

See also
 List of NCAA Division I baseball venues

References

College baseball venues in the United States
Minor league baseball venues
South Alabama Jaguars baseball
Sports venues in Mobile, Alabama
Baseball venues in Alabama
South Alabama Jaguars sports venues
Sports venues completed in 1980
1980 establishments in Alabama